The World Athlete of the Year award is a prize that can be won by athletes participating in events within the sport of athletics organised by World Athletics (formerly named IAAF), including track and field, cross country running, road running, and racewalking.

The first edition of awards in 1997, with winners Bulgaria's high jumper Stefka Kostadinova and Canadian sprinter Ben Johnson, had its results annulled. The athletes awarded in 1988 were Americans, namely sprinter Florence Griffith-Joyner and track and field athlete Carl Lewis.

Jamaican sprinter Usain Bolt is the only athlete, male or female, to win the World Athlete of the Year Awards six times. Russian pole vaulter Yelena Isinbayeva and Morocco's middle-distance runner Hicham El Guerrouj have won the main award three times. American track and field athlete Marion Jones, sprinter Sanya Richards-Ross representing the USA, Carl Lewis and other American sprinter Michael Johnson, Ethiopia's long-distance runner Kenenisa Bekele, Kenya's long-distance runner Eliud Kipchoge, and Swedish pole vaulter Armand Duplantis have won the award twice each.

The Rising Star of the Year award was inaugurated in 2005, when Great Britain's sprinter Harry Aikines-Aryeetey was awarded. The first woman to be voted was steeplechase specialist, Ruth Bosibori of Kenya, in 2007.

Belgian heptathlete Nafissatou Thiam was the first to receive Rising Star award followed by Athlete of the Year trophy. The other athletes to achieve the feat were Venezuela's triple jumper Yulimar Rojas, Swedish pole vaulter Armand Duplantis, and Norwegian hurdler Karsten Warholm. In 2022, American sprinter Erriyon Knighton became the first athlete to be crowned Rising Star twice.

Winners

Rising Star winners

References
 World Athletes of the Year. World Athletics. Retrieved on 2021-01-01.

 
Sport of athletics awards
Awards established in 1988
Most valuable player awards